Heruz Rural District is a rural district (dehestan) in Kuhsaran District, Ravar County, Kerman Province, Iran. At the 2006 census, its population was 3,436, in 938 families. The rural district has 43 villages.

References 

Rural Districts of Kerman Province
Ravar County